Aokana - Four Rhythms Across the Blue, known in Japan as , officially abbreviated as  and translated as Four Rhythms Across the Blue, is a Japanese adult visual novel developed by Sprite and released for Windows on November 28, 2014. The game was ported to the PlayStation Vita, PlayStation 4, and Nintendo Switch. The plot follows high school student Masaya Hinata as he coaches fellow students Asuka Kurashina, Misaki Tobisawa, Mashiro Arisaka, and Shion Aoyagi in the sport of "flying circus", wherein competitors travel through the sky via shoes with anti-gravity properties. Depending on the route taken, Masaya can enter a romantic relationship with either Asuka, Misaki, Mashiro, or Rika Ichinose, a student from a rival school and his neighbor.

A manga adaptation began publication in Comp Ace magazine in October 2015. A spin-off mobile game was released in October 2016, followed by two fandiscs in 2017 and 2022 respectively. A sequel was announced for production but has since been put on hold. An anime television series adaptation, produced by Gonzo, directed by Fumitoshi Oizaki, and written by Reiko Yoshida aired between January and March 2016. Crunchyroll and Funimation co-released the anime television series on Blu-ray in North America in 2018.

Gameplay
Aokana - Four Rhythms Across the Blue is a romance visual novel in which the player assumes the role of Masaya Hinata. Much of its gameplay is spent on reading the story's narrative and dialogue. The text in the game is accompanied by character sprites, which represent who Masaya is talking to, over background art. Throughout the game, the player encounters CG artwork at certain points in the story, which take the place of the background art and character sprites. The game follows a branching plot line with multiple endings, and depending on the decisions that the player makes during the game, the plot will progress in a specific direction.

There are four main plot lines that the player will have the chance to experience, one for each heroine. Throughout gameplay, the player is given multiple options to choose from, and text progression pauses at these points until a choice is made. Some decisions can lead the game to end prematurely, which offer an alternative ending to the plot. To view all plot lines in their entirety, the player will have to replay the game multiple times and choose different choices to further the plot to an alternate direction. Throughout gameplay, there are scenes with sexual CGs depicting Masaya and a given heroine having sex.

Plot
In an alternate universe, shoes with anti-gravity properties are invented called Grav-Shoes, which allow people to fly freely. This leads to the development of a sport known as Flying Circus, where participants either race from one buoy to another or touch the opponent's back to score points. Masaya Hinata is a student at Kunahama Institute, which is located in a four-island archipelago south of Japan. In the past, he was active in the sport, but quit due to an overwhelming defeat. His life changes when a cheerful girl named Asuka Kurashina transfers to his school. There, Asuka becomes interested in Flying Circus, and despite being unfamiliar with the sport and a newcomer to the use of Grav-Shoes, she manages to score a point during a match with the Vice-Captain of a powerhouse school, which is a truly amazing feat. This leads Asuka and Masaya, together with their classmate Misaki Tobisawa, first-year student Mashiro Arisaka and siblings Shion and Madoka Aoyagi to form a Flying Circus team, with the goal of finding success during the Flying Circus summer tournament. At the tournament, the world of Flying Circus is rocked by a new technique known as Birdcage, which leads to defeats for all the participants by a relative newcomer, Saki Inui, becoming the tournament's champion. As a result of her defeat, Misaki temporarily quits Flying Circus, and the club thinks of a strategy on how to beat Saki at the fall tournament. At the fall tournament, Asuka manages to defeat Saki during overtime, and Saki and the club members become friends.

Characters

Main characters

 (anime)
Masaya is player character in the visual novels and the supporting character in the anime. In his childhood, he was the prodigal protege of the world-famous Skywalker, Aoi Kagami, however after suffering a crushing defeat in a match against a certain player (later revealed to be Misaki in her route), he retired from the sport and went on with his high school life wanting to have nothing to do with Flying Circus. Upon meeting Asuka, he became the FC coach, but still refused to play. It is only after Misaki's return to the team and the determination of the other girls he decides to train alongside the girls. At the end of the series, he regains his desire to play FC again and is shown in his full gear while training the girls.

Flying style: All-rounder
Asuka is the heroine in the visual novels and the protagonist in the anime. Being a transfer student at Kunahama Institute, Asuka had never worn Grav-Shoes prior to moving to the island, but is able to pull off an air kick turn (a very difficult maneuver) her first time flying with them. Despite her ditziness she is also determined at times, training hard while having fun. She met Masaya when they were children and he inspired her to fly, but neither seems to remember the encounter. She forms a strong friendship with Misaki as the anime series progresses.

Flying style: Fighter
A second-year student at Kunahama Institute. Out of all the new Kunahama FC club members, she is the only one with previous experience in the sport. She and Mashiro are good friends, but in the anime Misaki forms a very strong friendship with Asuka as the series progressed. She has a fascination of cats and sometimes tends to add the word "nyaa" (Japanese for the sound "meow" that cats make) into her speech. Her favorite food is udon. While at first she only joined the team on a whim, Asuka convinced her to return, coming to really enjoy the FC. She's the rookie that defeated Masaya during the last game of his career, causing him to stop playing FC.

Flying style: Speeder
A first-year student at Kunahama whose family owns a restaurant that serves Misaki's favorite food, udon. She is very overprotective of Misaki and joins the FC club to be with her. She starts out as a Fighter because that is Misaki's flying style, but after befriending and training alongside Rika she realizes that she is more suited to be a Speeder.

Flying style: Speeder
Masaya's neighbor and a first-year student at Takafuji Academy, a school with one of the top FC teams. She befriends Mashiro when she helps her improve her playing style. Her favorite food is meat. While one of the heroines in the visual novel, she is a supporting character in the anime.

Other characters

Flying style: All-rounder
A second-year student at Takafuji and the Vice-Captain of the Takafuji FC club. She tend to be a little proud and self-centered, often making 'grand entrances'. She actually added the "-in" to the end of her family name "Satou", and Kazunari likes teasing her by calling her by her real name. Her family runs the Satou Food Group, a catering company famous for their high-quality seafood.

Flying style: Speeder
A second-year student at Kairyou Academy. She had previously participated in FC in England and is one of the fastest players in the world. She has a rather emotionless demeanor on the surface, but has a soft spot for cats, as such having the two cat-shaped hairclips around her plaits. She has been best friends with Irina since they were children and follows her every command while playing. In her final match with Asuka, she truly starts to enjoy FC and becomes friends with Asuka and her friends.

The physical and health education teacher at Kunahama Institute and a former national FC player. She serves as Masaya's mentor and the FC club's advisor. During her player days she created a technically called Angelic Halo, which is used for controlling the opponent. She is not proud of this technique and was distraught to discover that Irina and Saki had brought it back, albeit their own variation called the Birdcage. After Masaya returns to play, she also joins her students in training. After Asuka unlocks her balancer in her final match with Saki, Aoi comes to realize that her Angelic Halo ultimately had a positive effect, now causing the current FC to evolve again with no balance limiters.

Flying style: Speeder
A third-year student at Kunahama Institute and the president of the Kunahama FC club. He is the last remaining member of the club before Masaya and others joined and tends to be overly dramatic in his actions.

Manager of the Kunahama FC club and classmate of Asuka, Masaya and Misaki. She is Shion's younger sister. When her brother graduates she becomes the team's new captain, and tends to be the straight man in the antics of the other members.

Mashiro's classmate and member of the newspaper club in Kunahama. She's very energetic and always carries around a microphone. She is also the commentator for the FC tournaments.

A worker at Sky Sports Shirase, a sporting goods store owned by his family that sells FC equipment. He's also an old acquaintance of Aoi. According to Shindou, Shirase is a formerly well-known Skywalker like Aoi.

Hayato's younger sister. She helps out at the store and has a shy personality. As the masked Skywalker, she uses a voice modulator to hide her identity. She accidentally lets her true gender and identity slip during the fall tournament.

Mashiro's mother and owner of the family restaurant Mashiro Udon.

Flying style: All-rounder
Captain of the Takafuji FC club. He is a world-class FC player. He was inspired by Masaya to participate in FC hoping to beat him someday. He comes to see Asuka as a worthy opponent and uses his best tactics to defeat her after seeing she can keep up with him. He's defeated by Saki in the finals, but takes his loss surprisingly well. In both Asuka and Misaki's routes, Shindo is called in to assist Asuka (or Misaki in her route) to help train against Saki's Birdcage.

A second-year student at Kairyou Academy and Saki's coach. Originally from England, she is the daughter of a famous Grav-Shoe maker. She is obsessed in creating the "perfect and beautiful" FC based on Aoi's style and believes the current game is "false", convincing Saki that only their methods are necessary to win, wishing for a chance to prove her point by winning two tournaments in a row and forcing the FC Community to admit that their FC is far superior to that "circus imitation". However, after Asuka and Saki face each other with no balance limiters, she begins to enjoy the current FC and even shows remorse to Aoi after the match, acknowledging that her view of FC was wrong.

Flying style: Speeder
A first-year student at Shitou Suisan Academy. She is a close friend of Mashiro having known each other since their baby days. Her favorite food is tuna and is mockingly nicknamed "Maguro-chan". In the English publication of the visual novel, her nickname is "Tanner", instead due to her tanned skin and the untranslatable Japanese word play.

A second-year student at Shitou Suisan Academy and Arika's 'senpai' or senior and coach. She is admired greatly by Arika, who calls her 'milady'.

A second-year student at Dougaura High and Asuka's opponent in the second round of the Summer Tournament. A childhood friend of Rika, she was the one who introduced Rika to the world of Flying Circus, but later became disdained after being surpassed by Rika despite being the mentor. Thus, she began resorting to dirty tricks in her matches, which included performing illegal moves and giving concussions to her opponents. In Rika's route, she is defeated in the Fall Tournament by Rika after the former convinced her to return to her clean playing ways.

Development and release
Aokana - Four Rhythms Across the Blue is Sprite's second game after their debut title Love, Election and Chocolate. The game's producer was Akira Sakamoto. The project's planning was headed by Nachi Kio, who also contributed as the main scenario writer alongside Ryōichi Watanabe and Ryūsuke Mutsu. Artist Suzumori served as the art director and co-character designer with Itsuka Yūki. The background music was produced by members of Elements Garden. The game was released on November 28, 2014, as a limited edition version, playable on a Windows PC. A PlayStation Vita version of the game was released on February 25, 2016, and a high-definition version for the PlayStation 4 was released on January 26, 2017. A Nintendo Switch version of the game was released in late 2017.

A smartphone game titled Aokana - Four Rhythms Across the Blue: Eternal Sky was released on October 5, 2016, and a sequel titled Aokana - Four Rhythms Across the Blue: Zwei was announced at the AnimeJapan event in March 2016. Due to Sprite going on hiatus following in 2018, development of Zwei was indefinitely put on hold.

The game was announced for an English release by NekoNyan in 2019 on Steam. A Nintendo Switch version of the game was released on August 21, 2020 in North America and Europe. However, it has been delayed to an undetermined date for PlayStation 4 after its release was limited to digital-only due to changes related to seven scenes within the game and "significantly less interest" expected in a physical version as a result. Four scenes have been modified and three have been removed completely, while the Nintendo Switch release received no changes to content or choice between physical and digital versions.

Fandiscs 
A fandisc titled Aokana - Four Rhythms Across the Blue: Extra 1 was released in Japan on June 30, 2017, and worldwide on June 11, 2020. Extra 1S, a Nintendo Switch port of Extra 1, is confirmed to be in production as of June 2022, containing multiple new event scenes. 

Aokana - Four Rhythms Across the Blue: Extra 2, the second fandisc, was officially announced on June 16, 2020, and was released in Japan on May 27, 2022. An English release was announced on August 19, 2022.

A new game titled Aokana - Four Rhythms Across the Blue: If 01 - Minamo Shirase - was announced by Sprite in October 2021, and is currently in development by Filmic Novel, a brand of Sprite. It will feature Minamo Shirase as the main heroine.

Adaptations

Manga
A manga adaptation illustrated by Hideyu Tōgarashi began serialization in Kadokawa Corporation's Comp Ace magazine with the December 2015 issue sold on October 26, 2015. The first tankōbon volume was released on January 26, 2016.

Anime
An anime television series adaptation, produced by Gonzo, directed by Fumitoshi Oizaki, and written by Reiko Yoshida aired on TV Tokyo between January 12 and March 29, 2016. The anime series is licensed in North America by Crunchyroll, which arranged Funimation to release it on home video with an English dub on September 11, 2018. Although there are romantic plot lines with Masaya and each of the four heroines in the visual novel, this is averted in the anime adaptation, and the view-point character is Asuka instead of Masaya.

Music
Aokana: Four Rhythm Across the Blue has seven pieces of theme music: one opening theme, one insert song, and five ending themes. The insert song is "Infinite Sky" by Kotoko. Each heroine has her own ending theme, starting with Asuka's theme  by Misato Fukuen. Misaki's theme is "Sense of Life" by Azumi Asakura. Mashiro's theme is "Millions of You" by Nozomi Yamamoto. Rika's theme is "Night Flight" by Madoka Yonezawa. The main ending theme is "Sky is the Limit" by Kawada. In addition, an image song single titled "Rays of the Sun" by Kawada was released on December 28, 2014, at Comiket 87. The main opening theme for the HD versions of the game is "Crossing Way" by Kawada.

The single for "Contrail (Kiseki)" was released on January 27, 2016, and the single for "A-gain" was released on February 17, 2016; The opening theme to Ao no Kanata no Four Rhythm: Eternal Sky is "Believe in the Sky" by Kawada. A vocal collection of music for the series, which includes "Believe in the Sky", was released on May 1, 2016.

Reception
In the 2014 Moe Game Awards, Aokana - Four Rhythms Across the Blue placed first.

References

External links
 
Aokana - Four Rhythms Across the Blue at Sprite 
Anime official website 

2014 video games
Anime television series based on video games
Bishōjo games
Crunchyroll anime
Drama anime and manga
Eroge
Funimation
Gonzo (company)
Kadokawa Shoten manga
Manga based on video games
NBCUniversal Entertainment Japan
Nintendo Switch games
PlayStation Vita games
PlayStation 4 games
Romance anime and manga
School life in anime and manga
Science fiction anime and manga
Seinen manga
TV Tokyo original programming
Video games developed in Japan
Visual novels
Windows games
Censored video games